Auden Thornton is an American actress.

Life and career
Thornton was born and raised in Houston, Texas and began performing at a young age. At the age of nine, she was cast in the film Arlington Road starring Jeff Bridges and Joan Cusack. She attended Interlochen Center for the Arts in Michigan and later moved to New York City and graduated from the Juilliard School in 2011. In New York City, Thornton began performing in Off-Broadway plays, include Years of Sky and Three Sisters. She also guest-starred in a number of television series, include Blue Bloods, The Good Wife, Forever, and Elementary.

In 2017, Thornton played a leading role in the critically acclaimed independent drama film Beauty Mark. The film has 100% approval rating on Rotten Tomatoes. Thornton received positive reviews and won Los Angeles Film Festival Award for Best Breakout Performance. In 2019, she was cast in a recurring role for the fourth season of the NBC family drama series, This Is Us. In 2020, Thornton was cast in the ABC pilot Thirtysomething(else), the sequel to critically acclaimed drama Thirtysomething, in which she will play Brittany Weston, the daughter of Elliot Weston (Timothy Busfield) and Nancy Weston (Patricia Wettig).

Filmography

References

External links
 

21st-century American actresses
Living people
American television actresses
American film actresses
Actresses from Houston
Juilliard School alumni
Year of birth missing (living people)